Kyzylbulak Hydroelectric Power Plant is the hydroelectric power plant in Balpyk Bi, Koksu District, in Almaty Province, Kazakhstan.

References

Kaz-business.com

External links

Hydroelectric power stations in Kazakhstan